James Lawrence (1849 – 2 October 1898) was a New Zealand cricketer. He played in one first-class match for Wellington in 1873/74.

See also
 List of Wellington representative cricketers

References

External links
 

1849 births
1898 deaths
New Zealand cricketers
Wellington cricketers
Sportspeople from Surrey